The Singrobo Hydroelectric Power Station, also Singrobo-Ahouaty Hydroelectric Power Project, is a hydroelectric power station under construction across the Bandama River, in Ivory Coast. When completed, as expected in 2023, the power station will be the first, grid-ready hydroelectric power station, developed and owned by a independent power producer (IPP) in West Africa. The energy generated here will be sold to the Ivorian electric utility company, Cienergues, under a 35-year power purchase agreement (PPA).

Location
The power station is located in the villages of Singrobo and Ahouaty, in Tiassalé Department, Agnéby-Tiassa Region, in the Lagunes District of Ivory Coast.

Overview
In October 2018, the French civil engineering and construction company, Eiffage Group, was awarded the engineering, procurement and construction (EPC) contract to design and build this hydro power plant.

Other related infrastructure under the same EPC, includes the construction of a "discharge channel" for the power station, a 90kV substation outside the power station, a 90kV high voltage transmission line measuring  that will evacuate the power to a location where it will enter the national grid, and access roads to the power station.

Ownership
The power station is owned by a consortium comprising the shareholders outlined in the table below. The special purpose vehicle company created by the consiotium is called Ivoire Hydro Energy or IHE.

Construction costs and funding
The cost of construction is quoted as €195 million or US$214 million. Funding agencies for this project include (a) Africa Finance Corporation (AFC) (b) Emerging Africa Infrastructure Fund (EAIF) and the German Investment Corporation (DEG). The lenders are providing an estimated 75 percent of the budget while the owner consortium will raise the remaining 25 percent as equity investment.

Other considerations
The power station will on annual basis supply 217 GWh of clean energy, enabling the country to avoid the emission of 124,000 tons of carbon dioxide in the same period. During the construction period, an estimated 500 jobs are expected to be created.

The African Development Bank, agreed with the developer/owner consortium to implement a Resettlement Action Plan (RAP) involving 730 people, who "will be impacted by the project".

See also

 List of power stations in Ivory Coast

References

External links
 About Singrobo Hydroelectric Power Station In original French Language. Google can Translate.

Hydroelectric power stations in Ivory Coast
Energy infrastructure under construction